Benoit Dorais is a city councillor from Montreal, Quebec, Canada. He has served as the borough mayor of Le Sud-Ouest since 2009. From his first election to 2013, Dorais was a member of Vision Montreal, before joining Coalition Montréal in 2013 and Projet Montréal prior to the 2017 municipal election.

Dorais was born and raised in the Saint-Henri neighbourhood. Prior to his election as city councillor, Dorais served as a political staff member to former Bloc Québécois MP Thierry St-Cyr. He has also served as a commissioner with the Commission scolaire de Montréal since 2007. He holds a university degree in philosophy and social ethics.

Following Marcel Côté's death on May 26, 2014, Dorais became leader of Coalition Montreal. In 2017 he resigned that role to sit as an independent, joining Projet Montréal soon after, prior to the 2017 elections.

Dorais chaired the City of Montreal committee on social development and Montreal diversity. Following the 2017 election, Mayor Valérie Plante named him chair of the Montreal Executive Committee, with responsibility for finances, human resources, and legal affairs.

Electoral record

References

External links
Ville de Montréal - Détail d'un élu: Benoit Dorais

Montreal city councillors
Living people
Mayors of places in Quebec
People from Le Sud-Ouest
21st-century Canadian politicians
Year of birth missing (living people)